Shlomo "Soli" Tzemah (born 5 June 1981) is an Israeli footballer who currently plays for Beitar Kfar Saba.

External links
Soli Tzemah Maccabi Petah Tikva FC 

1981 births
Israeli footballers
Living people
Maccabi Petah Tikva F.C. players
Hapoel Ironi Kiryat Shmona F.C. players
Hapoel Nir Ramat HaSharon F.C. players
Maccabi Jaffa F.C. players
Hapoel Herzliya F.C. players
Beitar Kfar Saba F.C. players
F.C. Shikun HaMizrah players
Hapoel Mahane Yehuda F.C. players
Hapoel Bik'at HaYarden F.C. players
Footballers from Petah Tikva
Israeli people of Iraqi-Jewish descent
Israeli Premier League players
Liga Leumit players
Association football midfielders